Lignières-Ambleville is a commune in the Charente department in Nouvelle-Aquitaine in southwestern France. It is the result of the merger, on 1 January 2022, of the communes of Lignières-Sonneville and Ambleville.

See also
Communes of the Charente department

References

Communes of Charente
Communes nouvelles of Charente
2022 establishments in France

Populated places established in 2022